This article shows the rosters of all participating teams at the 2019 FIVB Volleyball Men's U21 World Championship in Bahrain.

Argentina

The following is the Argentine roster in the 2019 FIVB Volleyball Men's U21 World Championship.

Head coach: Alejandro Grossi

Brazil

The following is the Brazilian roster in the 2019 FIVB Volleyball Men's U21 World Championship.

Head coach: Giovane Gávio

Bahrain

The following is the Bahraini roster in the 2019 FIVB Volleyball Men's U21 World Championship.

Head coach: Yusuf Khalifa

Canada

The following is the Canadian roster in the 2019 FIVB Volleyball Men's U21 World Championship.

Head coach: João Paulo Bravo

China

The following is the Chinese roster in the 2019 FIVB Volleyball Men's U21 World Championship.

Head coach: Hao Liu

Cuba

The following is the Cuban roster in the 2019 FIVB Volleyball Men's U21 World Championship.

Head coach: Angel Cruz

Czech Republic

The following is the Czech roster in the 2019 FIVB Volleyball Men's U21 World Championship.

Head coach: Jan Svoboda

Egypt

The following is the Egyptian roster in the 2019 FIVB Volleyball Men's U21 World Championship.

Head coach: Hossameldin Eissawy

Iran

The following is the Iranian roster in the 2019 FIVB Volleyball Men's U21 World Championship.

Head coach: Behrouz Ataei

Italy

The following is the Italian roster in the 2019 FIVB Volleyball Men's U21 World Championship.

Head coach: Monica Cresta

South Korea

The following is the South Korean roster in the 2019 FIVB Volleyball Men's U21 World Championship.

Head coach: Kyungsuk Lee

Morocco

The following is the Moroccan roster in the 2019 FIVB Volleyball Men's U21 World Championship.

Head coach: Khalid Berma

Poland

The following is the Polish roster in the 2019 FIVB Volleyball Men's U21 World Championship.

Head coach: Michał Bąkiewicz

Puerto Rico

The following is the Puerto Rican roster in the 2019 FIVB Volleyball Men's U21 World Championship.

Head coach: Francisco Negron

Russia

The following is the Russian roster in the 2019 FIVB Volleyball Men's U21 World Championship.

Head coach: Andrey Nozdrin

Tunisia

The following is the Tunisian roster in the 2019 FIVB Volleyball Men's U21 World Championship.

Head coach: Amine Basdouri

References

External links
 Official website

FIVB Volleyball Men's U21 World Championship
FIVB U21 World Championship
FIVB Volleyball World Championship squads